Kurylivka is an urban-type settlement in Dnipro Raion of Dnipropetrovsk Oblast in Ukraine. It is located on the right bank of the Dnieper, downstream of the Kamianske Reservoir, across the river from the city of Kamianske. Kurylivka belongs to Petrykivka settlement hromada, one of the hromadas of Ukraine. Population: 

Until 18 July 2020, Kurylivka belonged to Petrykivka Raion. The raion was abolished in July 2020 as part of the administrative reform of Ukraine, which reduced the number of raions of Dnipropetrovsk Oblast to seven. The area of Petrykivka Raion was merged into Dnipro Raion.

Economy

Transportation
Kurylivka has access to Highway H08 which connects Kamianske and Kremenchuk, as well as to Highway H31 connecting Dnipro and Reshetylivka with further access to Poltava and Kyiv.

Kurylivka is on the railway connecting Kamianske and Dnipro via Balivka. There are two railway stations near the settlement, 50 km and 52 km. There is infrequent passenger traffic.

References

Urban-type settlements in Dnipro Raion